"This New Year" is a new-year themed song by Cliff Richard, released as a single in the UK on 30 December 1991. It was the second single released from his first Christmas album, Together with Cliff Richard.

The song was written by Chris Eaton who had written Richard's 1990 Christmas single, "Saviour's Day", which had reached number one in the UK Singles Chart the previous year. "This New Year" reached number 30 early January 1992.

Track listing
UK 7" Single (EMS218) and Cassette (TCEM218)
"This New Year"
"Scarlet Ribbons"

UK 12" Single (12EMP218)
"This New Year"
"Scarlet Ribbons" (12" remix)
"We Don't Talk Anymore" (1991  remix)

UK CD Single (CDEM218)
"This New Year"
"I Love You" (live acoustic version, from "Together with Cliff Richard" video album)
"Scarlet Ribbons" (12" remix)
"We Don't Talk Anymore" (1991  remix)

Chart performance

References

1991 singles
Cliff Richard songs
Songs written by Chris Eaton (UK musician)
1991 songs